Prouty Glacier is located in the U.S. state of Oregon. Prouty Glacier is on the northeast slopes of South Sister, a dormant stratovolcano. Beyond the current range of the glacier, glacially formed Carver Lake lies to the immediate northeast of Prouty Glacier and is impounded by the old terminal moraine of the glacier.

See also
 List of glaciers in the United States

References

Glaciers of Oregon
Glaciers of Deschutes County, Oregon